The basal eudicots are a group of 13 related families of flowering plants in four orders: Buxales, Proteales, Ranunculales and Trochodendrales. Like other eudicots, they have pollen grains with three colpi (grooves) or other derived structures. They also usually have flowers with four or five petals (sometimes multiples of four or five, sometimes reduced or fused). Unlike other eudicots, these orders sometimes have flowers with petals in twos or multiples of two.

The basal eudicots include trees, shrubs, woody vines and herbaceous plants. Cultivars of Buxus are used for hedges and topiary. The sacred lotus is the national flower of India and Vietnam, and the waratah is the floral emblem of the Australian state of New South Wales. The opium poppy, Papaver somniferum, now a source of morphine, was cultivated thousands of years ago in Mesopotamia. Macademia nuts are grown agriculturally mainly in Hawaii and Australia.

The eudicot orders Dilleniales and Gunnerales are basal in the usual sense (they diverged at an early stage from the other eudicots), although they did not diverge as early as the other four orders, and the term "basal eudicots" does not usually refer to these two orders. Species of Gunnerales often have serrate (serrated) leaves, with flowers similar to those of Buxales. The epidermis and hairs on species of Dilleniales are often full of silica.

Glossary

From the glossary of botanical terms:
annual: a plant that completes its life cycle (i.e. germinates, reproduces, and dies) within a single year or growing season
deciduous: shedding or falling seasonally, as with bark, leaves, or petals
herbaceous: not woody; usually green and soft in texture
perennial: not an annual or biennial
unisexual: not bisexual; bearing only male or only female reproductive organs

Gunnerales and Dilleniales families

Basal eudicot families

See also

Notes

Citations

References

 
   See http://creativecommons.org/licenses/by/4.0/ for license.
 
 
 
 
 
  See their terms-of-use license.
 
 
 

Systematic
Taxonomic lists (families)
Gardening lists
Lists of plants
Eudicots